Cappelletti (also called Hamilton and Pottage) is one of many defensive bridge bidding conventions used in the card game contract bridge to compete or interfere in the auction when an opponent has opened one notrump (1NT). Usually attributed to Michael Cappelletti and his longtime partner Edwin Lewis, origin of the concept is also claimed by Fred Hamilton, John Pottage and Gerald Helms. Cappelletti can show a variety of one- and two-suited hands while retaining the penalty double for stronger hands.

Application 
Cappelletti is particularly recommended for use against a weak 1NT opening (12-14 HCP) but can also be used against stronger 1NT openings (15-17 HCP). Cappelletti can be employed in either the direct or balancing seat.

Double
When holding 15 or more high card points (HCP), a Double is for penalties.

Overcalls
With 9-14 HCP, other overcalls are artificial bids promising either a one-suited or two-suited holding. Importance is given to the state of vulnerability and the location of the values, which should be concentrated in the suit or suits held. 

Over the 1NT opening, the over-calling opponent (known as 'Intervener') makes one of the following artificial bids to indicate a one-suited or a two-suited hand:
2 declares a one-suited hand - usually 6 or more cards, but some bid with a strong 5-card suit. Partner (known as 'Advancer') is expected to respond as follows:
usually, Advancer makes an artificial 'relay' bid of 2, asking Intervener to pass if his suit is diamonds and otherwise to bid his long suit at the lowest level.
exceptionally, if Advancer has a good 6-card major suit of his own, he bids two of that major in place of the conventional relay bid, over-ruling his partner.
2 declares both major suits (traditionally at least 5-5 in length but now, often reduced to 5-4 or 4-5). Advancer corrects to his longest major, bidding at the lowest level.
2 (or 2) declares hearts (or spades) and also an as yet undisclosed minor suit;(because you are inviting partner to pass with a tolerance for the Major suit, this should better to be at least 5-4 in favour of the major suit). With a tolerance of the major suit, Advancer passes. Otherwise Advancer bids 2NT inviting Intervener to bid his minor as a last stop; before making the switch to the minor it is usually possible to deduce what that minor suit will likely be, since length in a suit in partner's hand is likely to reflect a suit shortage in your own hand.
2NT declares both minor suits (at least 5-4 or 4-5). Advancer corrects to his longest minor, bidding at the lowest level.

All artificial bids must be alerted.

Reverse Cappelletti or Multi-Landy
This variant reverses the 2 and 2 bids above, so that for hands with both majors it is similar to the Multi-Landy convention.

Extending the bidding towards game 
With a strong hand of his own, (13+ HCP) Advancer may think that the defensive partnership could have the possibility of a game call themselves.

To explore this possibility, any bid by Advancer beyond the natural conclusion of the Intervener calls described above, is invitational to game.Such a bid shows most importantly the High Card Points range in Advancer's holding (which should be 13+ HCP — at weakest, Intervener has promised only 9 HCPs, and since bidding is now advancing to the 3-level, 13 HCP in advancer's hand guarantees a minimum joint holding of 22 HCP for the partnership).

(Advancer should consider that if he makes a 3-level bid in a suit ranking above the 'Cappelletti' suit, then there may be no exit to bidding short of a Game Call anyway — consider if you will be forcing a de facto game call by advancing the bidding in this way, and what are the probabilities of the partnership holding supporting this?)

The most common and most useful circumstance for this, is when the defender's own game call is likely to be 3NT. Look at the following scenarios:

 In this scenario, a Cappelletti bidding sequence between Intervener and Advancer of, for example, overcall 2-2-2 shows Advancer that partner has 9-14 HCP in a spades suit.

So if Advancer's holding is 14+ HCP and with stops in the other suits, (bearing in mind that partner might have shortage in at least one of them so those stops need to be dependable), Advancer might extend the bidding to 2NT asking Intervener 'are you top or bottom of your points range partner?'.

With only 9-10 HCP, Intervener either passes, or if his own suit is likely to perform better, signs-off by re-bidding his own suit.

But with 11+ HCP, thus promising a partnership holding of at least 25 HCPs, Intervener advances to a game call of 3NT.

Finally if Advancer has shortage in the Capelletti suit then 3NT is passed, but with 3+ card support for partner's Cappelletti MAJOR suit, then sign-off by correcting to a game call in the major suit.

(With the opposition opening 1NT it is unlikely you would want to go beyond 3NT if the Cappelletti suit is a minor).

 In this scenario, a Cappelletti bid from Intervener of, for example, overcall 2 shows Advancer that partner has 9-14 HCP in a hearts suit and also another undisclosed 4 card minor suit.

So if Advancer is holding 14+ HCP and three cards in hearts, Advancer should extend the bidding to 3 asking Intervener 'are you top or bottom of your points range partner?'.

With only 9-10 HCP Intervener now assesses the his shortage points using, possibly, the method of 'Losing Trick Count' and thus decides whether to pass 3 or sign-off with a game call of 4.

Of course with 11+ HCP Intervener doesn't need to think before signing-off with a game call of 4.

 Of course there are many examples like this; I will give one more which is similar to the last one but in a minor suit; in this scenario, a Cappelletti bid from Intervener of, for example, overcall 2 shows Advancer that partner has 9-14 HCP in a hearts suit and also another undisclosed 4 card minor suit.

So with Advancer's holding of 14+ HCP but only two cards in hearts (happens to be merely two small values for example) Advancer bids 2NT inviting Intervener to bid his minor. So the bidding sequence has now been  2-2NT-3.

Advancer now has to assess what the joint holding is; Partner likely has stopping values in Hearts, but anyway partner's length assures the Heart suit is safe. Provided that Advancer has stopping values in the other three suits in his own holding (bearing in mind that partner may not have stopping values in Diamonds, merely 4-card length), the only question for Advancer is whether or not the HCP holding for the partnership is strong enough for 3NT.

Unless Advancer has 16 HCP minimum, this becomes a judgement decision (can we afford the risk of 1-off? do I hold 14 HCP? 15 HCP or better?

Given that Partner's range could be as little as 9 or 10, if I hold 14 HCP then the balance of our holding is more likely than not to equal 25+ HCP, and finally, with our holding being this high, we know where most all outstanding cards are i.e. in Opener's hand, so does that possibly help us to place the lead into Opener's hand leading towards a tenace perhaps in ours, or to finesse?

Much to consider but so many likely situations that support a 3NT call for our partnership.

See also
Bidding system
Glossary of contract bridge terms
List of defenses to 1NT

References

External links
 Bridge Buff website commentary on the MONK convention and shortcomings of Cappelletti

Bridge conventions